Vice Admiral Sir Iwan Geoffrey Raikes KCB CBE DSC DL (21 April 1921 – 27 December 2011) was a former Royal Navy officer who became Naval Secretary.

Naval career
Born the son of Admiral Sir Robert Raikes and educated at the Royal Naval College, Dartmouth, Raikes joined the Royal Navy in 1935 and decided to specialise in submarines. He served in World War II and commanded the submarines HMS H43 and HMS Varne.

After the War he commanded the submarines HMS Virtue, HMS Talent and HMS Aeneas and then the frigate HMS Loch Insh. He was appointed deputy director of Undersurface Warfare in 1962, Director of Plans and Operations on the staff of Commander-in-Chief, Far East in 1965 and Captain of the destroyer HMS Kent in 1968. Promoted to rear-admiral, he went on to be Naval Secretary in 1970; after being promoted to vice-admiral he became Flag Officer First Flotilla in 1973 and Flag Officer Submarines and Commander of Submarines, Eastern Atlantic Area in 1974 before retiring in 1977.

In retirement he became Chairman of the United Usk Fishermen's Association as well as Deputy Lieutenant of Powys. He died on 27 December 2011.

Family
In 1947 he married (Cecilia) Primrose Hunt; they have one son and one daughter. Lady Raikes died in 2022.

References

|-

1921 births
2011 deaths
Royal Navy vice admirals
Knights Commander of the Order of the Bath
Commanders of the Order of the British Empire
Recipients of the Distinguished Service Cross (United Kingdom)
Deputy Lieutenants of Powys
Royal Navy submarine commanders
Royal Navy officers of World War II
People from Weymouth, Dorset